The Asian Cricket Council Asia Cup is a men's One Day International, Limited-overs (50 overs) and Twenty20 International cricket tournament. It was established in 1983 when the Asian Cricket Council was founded as a measure to promote goodwill between Asian countries. It was originally scheduled to be held every two years. The Asia Cup is the only continental championship in cricket and the winning team becomes the champion of Asia. It alternates every 2-years between ODI, 50 overs and T20I formats.

The first Asia Cup was held in 1984 in Sharjah in the United Arab Emirates where the council's offices were based (until 1995). India boycotted the 1986 tournament due to strained cricketing relations with Sri Lanka. Pakistan boycotted the 1990–91 tournament due to strained political relations with India and the 1993 tournament was cancelled for the same reason. The ACC announced that the tournament would be held biennially from 2009 onwards. The ICC has ruled that all games played in the Asia Cup have official ODI status.

After downsizing the Asian Cricket Council in 2015, it was announced by the ICC that Asia Cup events from 2016 would be played on a rotation basis between One Day International and Twenty20 International format, on the basis of the format of upcoming world events. As a result, the 2016 event was the first event played in the T20I format and functioned as a preparatory tournament ahead of the 2016 ICC World Twenty20.

India, with seven titles (six ODI and one T20I), is the most successful team in the tournament. Sri Lanka is the second most successful team, with six. Sri Lanka has played the most Asia Cups (14) followed by India, Pakistan and Bangladesh who have played 13 each.

History

1984–1988

The first edition of the Rothmans Asia Cup was held in 1984 in Sharjah, UAE, the location of the headquarters of the newly formed Asian Cricket Council. The tournament was a round-robin tournament among India, Sri Lanka and Pakistan. The first match was between Pakistan and the new ICC member Sri Lanka. India won this tournament with two victories, Sri Lanka were the runners up in the tournament with a single victory over Pakistan, while Pakistan went home without winning any of its two games.

Sri Lanka was the host for the second edition in 1986. India pulled out of the tournament due to soured cricketing relations with Sri Lanka after a controversial series in Sri Lanka the previous year. Bangladesh was included for the first time. Sri Lanka won the tournament beating Pakistan in the final.

The third edition, in 1988, was held in Bangladesh, the first time a multi-national cricket tournament was held there. In the final, India beat Sri Lanka by 6 wickets to win their second Asia Cup.

1990–1997

The fourth edition of the tournament was held in India in 1990–91. Pakistan had pulled out of the tournament due to strained political relations with India. India retained the Asia Cup defeating Sri Lanka in the final.

In 1993, the tournament was cancelled due to strained political relations between India and Pakistan.

The fifth edition, in 1995, took the series back to Sharjah, UAE after 11 years. India and Sri Lanka made it to the final by virtue of better run rate than Pakistan as all three teams had equal points after the preliminary round. For the third successive time, India defeated Sri Lanka in the final.

The sixth edition was held in Sri Lanka in 1997. Sri Lanka beat India in the final by 8 wickets to win its second Asia Cup.

2000–2010

The seventh edition took place in Bangladesh for the second time in 2000. Pakistan and Sri Lanka made it to the final while India only won one match against Bangladesh and did not qualify for the final for the first time. In the final, Pakistan beat Sri Lanka to win the Asia Cup for the first time. Yousuf Youhana was the player of the Tournament.

The eighth edition took place in Sri Lanka in 2004. There was a change in the tournament format as UAE and Hong Kong were also included for the first time and the tournament was now divided into three stages – the Group Stage,  Super Fours and the final. The group stage was divided into two groups of 3 teams, each playing each other once. The top two teams from each group qualified for the Super Four stage where they played each other again once. The top two teams in the Super Four stage then qualified for the final. Hosts Sri Lanka, India and UAE were placed in Group A while the then defending champions Pakistan, Bangladesh and Hong Kong were placed in Group B. UAE and Hong Kong were knocked out in the group stage. Bangladesh had the distinction of reaching the second stage in a major tournament for the first time, but played poorly in the Super Fours and got eliminated. India and Sri Lanka topped the Super Four stage and reached the final. In the final, Sri Lanka defeated India by 25 runs to win the Asia Cup. Sanath Jayasuriya was the player of the Tournament.

The ninth edition of the Asia Cup was held in Pakistan. Once again, the 2004 format was retained. The tournament started on 24 June 2008 and the Final was held on 6 July 2008. Sri Lanka topped Group A and qualified for the second phase along with Bangladesh. In Group B, India came out on top and entered the Super Fours along with Pakistan in second place. Sri Lanka and India topped the Super Four stage and entered the final.  Sri Lanka beat India in the final comfortably winning their fourth Asia Cup. Sanath Jayasuriya scored a quick 125 off 114 balls to rescue Sri Lanka from 66/4 earlier on when the top order collapsed. Sri Lanka's new mystery spinner, Ajantha Mendis, took 6/13 bowling Sri Lanka to a 100 run victory. He also was adjudged as the Player of the Tournament.

The tenth edition was held in Sri Lanka, between 15 and 24 June 2010 hosting the Asia Cup for the fourth time. It only featured the four Test playing Asian nations, and seven matches were played in all (including the final). Sri Lanka and India topped the group stages and entered the final. In the final, India beat Sri Lanka comfortably to become champions for the fifth time, winning the tournament for first time in 15 years. Shahid Afridi was the Player of the Tournament.

2012–2014

The eleventh edition of Asia Cup was held in Dhaka, Bangladesh from 11 to 22 March 2012. Pakistan and Bangladesh qualified to play in the final of the eleventh edition, Bangladesh had beaten India and Sri Lanka to book its place in the final for the first time in the history of the tournament.
Pakistan beat Bangladesh after a thrilling final over, winning their second Asia Cup. Shakib Al Hasan was adjudged the Player of the Tournament.Sachin Tendulkar scored his 100th international century in this tournament.

The twelfth edition was held in Dhaka and Fatullah, Bangladesh from 25 February to 8 March 2014. The tournament consisted of five teams with Afghanistan in it for the first time since its inception in 1984. Sri Lanka defeated Pakistan by 5 wickets in the final to win the Asia Cup for the fifth time. Lahiru Thirimanne was adjudged the Player of the tournament scoring 279 runs.

2016

After the Asian Cricket Council was downsized by the ICC in 2015, it was announced that Asia Cup tournaments will be played on rotation basis in ODI and T20I format. As a result, 2016 events was the first tournament in T20I format and was played between five teams just ahead of 2016 ICC World Twenty20. The 2016 edition of the Asia Cup tournament was held in Bangladesh for the third consecutive time from 24 February to 6 March. The final was held on 6 March 2016. India won the final by beating Bangladesh by 8 wickets in the final held at the Sher-e-Bangla National Stadium situated in Mirpur locality, Dhaka, Bangladesh. It is for the sixth time that India won the Asia cup title in 2016. Shikhar Dhawan of India was the man of the match for his 60 runs. Sabbir Rahman of Bangladesh was the player of the series.

India won all of its matches played in Asia Cup 2016 beating Bangladesh 2 times, Pakistan, Sri Lanka and UAE.

2018

On 29 October 2015, following the Asian Cricket Council meeting in Singapore, BCCI secretary Anurag Thakur stated that the 2018 edition of the tournament would be held in India. It will follow the ODI format. However, in April 2018, the tournament was moved to the United Arab Emirates, due to political tensions between India and Pakistan.

India were the defending champions, and retained their title, after beating Bangladesh by three wickets in the final. India did not suffer a single defeat in the tournament, with 2 wins each against Pakistan & Bangladesh, a solitary win against Hong Kong, and a tie with Afghanistan.

Shikhar Dhawan was the top run getter with 342 runs in 5 matches, was awarded Man of the Series.

Afghanistan was the only team in the tournament who remained unbeaten against eventual winners India.

2020
Due to the COVID-19 pandemic, the 2020 Asia Cup was first postponed to 2021 with Sri Lanka set to host the event but was later pushed back to 2022 with matches to be played in UAE owing to the packed international schedule and the rising covid cases in Sri Lanka.

2022
 United Arab Emirates hosted the tournament and Sri Lanka won the Asia Cup beating Pakistan by 23 runs in the final. Sri Lanka reached the final as the only unbeaten team in the Super-Four stage winning against Afghanistan, India, and Pakistan. 
Bhanuka Rajapaksa was awarded Man of the Match for his unbeaten 71 off 45 balls, and Wanindu Hasaranga was second highest wicket-taker with 9 wickets in 6 matches, scored 66 runs in 5 innings and was named Player of the Series.

Pakistan had an average start in the Asia cup with a defeat against India in group stage, beating India in a close encounter, & Afghanistan in Super 4, ending with 2 back-to-back defeats against Sri Lanka.

India started the tournament as hot favourites defeating Pakistan; however, they could not win important matches of super 4 and got knocked out of the tournament

Afghanistan was the only team in the tournament to defeat the eventual winners Sri Lanka.

Results

Tournament summary

Combined
The table below provides an overview of the performances of teams over past Asia Cup ODI and T20I tournaments.

ODIs
The table below provides an overview of the performances of teams over past Asia Cup ODI tournaments.

T20Is
The table below provides an overview of the performances of teams in the Asia Cup T20I tournament.

Last Update: SL vs PAK on 11th Sep 2022

Note:
 The win percentage excludes no-result matches and counts ties as half a win.
 Teams are sorted by best result, then winning percentage, then (if equal) by alphabetical order.

Performance by teams
An overview of the teams' performances in every Asia Cup:
India has most titles i.e. 7, while Sri Lanka has second highest 6.

Debutant teams in main tournament

Debutant teams in Asia Cup Qualifier

Championship summary

Broadcasters

See also 

 Asian Test Championship
 List of Asia Cup cricket records
 List of Asia Cup centuries
 List of Asia Cup five-wicket hauls
 Women's Asia Cup
 ACC Emerging Teams Asia Cup
 ACC Under-19 Cup

References

External links 
Asia cup Related news at Journofacts

 
Recurring sporting events established in 1984
One Day International cricket competitions
Cricket in Asia
Asian championships
Biennial sporting events